Herbert Gardiner Lord (1849–1930) was  an American  philosopher.

Biography
Lord was born in Boston on March 29, 1849. He was the son of the Rev. Daniel Miner Lord and was graduated from Amherst College in 1871 and at the Union Theological Seminary in 1877.

Lord was ordained to the Presbyterian ministry in 1878 and served as pastor of the church of the Redeemer, Buffalo, New York, 1877–1895. During 1895–1898 he was professor of philosophy at the School of Pedagogy, University of Buffalo; from 1890 to 1900 was principal of Franklin School, Buffalo; and in 1900 was appointed professor of philosophy at Columbia University.

Works
He was one of the joint authors of Essays Philosophical and Psychological in Honor of William James; and is the author of The Psychology of Courage (1918).

Notes

References

20th-century American philosophers
American Presbyterian ministers
Clergy from Boston
Columbia University faculty
1849 births
1930 deaths
University at Buffalo faculty